Janet Elder was a writer, author, editor and reporter who worked for The New York Times for about three decades. She began working for the Times as a reporter in the mid-1980s, and eventually became one of their top editors. At her death in 2017, she was one of the highest ranking women at the Times. During her tenure, she wrote about several social issues, explained survey results, and edited for election analyses. She also conducted administrative work behind the scenes.

Early life and education
Elder was born in Poughkeepsie, New York on July 6, 1956. She attended New York University where she received both a bachelor's degree and then a master's degree.

Career
In 1975, Elder interviewed for a Times/CBS News poll, but didn't begin working for the Times as a reporter until the mid-1980s. She wrote a book after being diagnosed with cancer called Huck. She married Rich Pinsky in 1985 and they had a son. She died on December 20, 2017, at age 61 after suffering from cancer.

References 

1956 births
2017 deaths
American women writers
American reporters and correspondents
Editors of New York City newspapers
The New York Times people
American women journalists
20th-century American journalists
Women newspaper editors
20th-century American women
21st-century American women